"Cool It Down" is a song by Australian-New Zealand band Coterie, released as their debut single through Massive Records in New Zealand in December 2021. The song reached the top 30 in New Zealand.

Background and composition

The song was produced by the band at their home studio in their parents' living room in Perth, and features additional production by South African producer Robby De Sá. The song is an ode to their two homes, Tauranga in Aotearoa / New Zealand and West Coast Drive in Perth. The group composed the song together in writing sessions with an acoustic guitar, and was inspired by their inability to easily return home due to the COVID-19 pandemic, and the need to limit social interactions in the short-term, to be able to interact in the future.

Release

The song was released as a single on 3 December 2021. The band translated the song into Māori with help from Tīmoti Kāretu, "Purea / Cool It Down" was released on 2 September 2022, and was one of the most commercially successful songs released for Te Wiki o te Reo Māori 2022.

Credits and personnel
Credits adapted from Tidal.

Coterie – performer, producer
Robby De Sá – engineer, mixing engineer, producer
Antoni Fisher – engineer, songwriting
Brandford Fisher – songwriting
Conrad Fisher – songwriting
Joshua Fisher – engineer, songwriting
Tyler Fisher – songwriting
Paul Stefanidis – mastering engineer

Charts

Certifications

Release history

References

2021 singles
2021 songs
New Zealand songs